Jonathan S. Weissman is the Landon T. Clay Professor of Biology at the Massachusetts Institute of Technology, a member of the Whitehead Institute, and a Howard Hughes Medical Institute Investigator. From 1996 to 2020, he was a faculty member in the department of Cellular Molecular Pharmacology at the University of California, San Francisco.

Education
He earned his B.A. in Physics from Harvard College (1988) and his Ph.D. in Physics (1993) from MIT working with Peter Kim. There, he started his studies on protein folding examining Bovine pancreatic trypsin inhibitor (BPTI).

He was a postdoctoral fellow at Yale University (1993-1996), where he worked with Arthur Horwich studying the mechanism of GroEL.

Career
Weissman's research team studies how cells ensure that proteins fold into their correct shape, as well as the role of protein misfolding in disease and normal physiology. The team also develops experimental and analytical approaches for exploring the organizational principles of biological systems and globally monitoring protein translation through ribosome profiling. A broad goal of his work is to bridge large-scale approaches and in depth mechanistic investigations to reveal the information encoded within genomes. 

Weissman has been a member of the National Academy of Sciences since 2009.

References

External links 
UCSF Academic Bio
His Howard Hughes Medical Institute bio
Weissman Lab website

Living people
American biochemists
Howard Hughes Medical Investigators
Place of birth missing (living people)
Year of birth missing (living people)
University of California, San Francisco faculty
Members of the United States National Academy of Sciences
Harvard College alumni
MIT Department of Physics alumni